Esteban Alegre (c. 1550  c. 1620) was a Spanish Creole landowner and conquistador. He was one of the neighbors founders of Buenos Aires and Corrientes.

Biography 
He was born in Asunción, and arrived in Buenos Aires as a member of the contingent led by Juan de Garay, for the second foundation of the city in 1580. 
 
The same year of the foundation, Esteban Alegre received 3000 varas of land located on the border of Riachuelo, (La Matanza). In 1582, he received encomienda of the tribe Alacas (of Guaraní origen) commanded by the cacique Suguna.

Esteban Alegre was married to Isabel de Pantoja, daughter of Isabel Pantoja and Esteban de Vallejos, a Spanish conquistador born in Somorrostro, and who served as Captain and regidor of Santa Fe for 1590s. His ancestors were Luis Alegre and Dionis de Lys, conquerors from Flanders.

References

External links 
cervantes virtual.com

16th-century explorers
Explorers of Argentina
People from Asunción
People from Buenos Aires
Spanish people of Flemish descent
Spanish conquistadors
1550s births
1620s deaths